Austin Gary (born Gary Austin Heyde, March 7, 1947) is an American novelist and writer, best known as a songwriter for "The Car" by Jeff Carson (as Gary Heyde) and recordings by other country performers like Tammy Wynette and John Berry, and as associate producer of albums by Carson, Berry and Hank Williams Jr.'s Hog Wild album.

Career

Novelist and playwright

His new novel, A Delicate Dance, published in December 2015, was named Indiefab Award "Book of the Year" in LGBT adult fiction by Foreword Reviews. Earlier, it was a finalist (novel-in-progress) in the 2014 Faulkner Wisdom competition. His novel The Queerling, published in October 2013, was a short-list finalist in 2012 Faulkner-Wisdom Literary Competition and was a 2013 IndieFab Award Finalist from ForeWord Reviews. His novel Miss Madeira, published in August 2011, was a finalist in the 2009 Faulkner-Wisdom Literary Competition and a finalist (short list) in ForeWords First Debut Fiction competition. In 2008, his unpublished novel "Ask Me No Secrets" was a finalist in the Pacific Northwest Writers Association Literary Competition. "Genius", Gary's novel in progress, was a Finalist (Short List) in the 2010 Faulkner-Wisdom Literary Competition. His historical novel "Genius" was also a finalist in the 2013 Pacific Northwest Writers Assoc. Literary Competition. His novels "Miss Madeira" and "Genius" ("The Soul of Genius") have both been adapted into plays. His latest, "Song of Myself", is a one-man Walt Whitman play.

Songwriting
"One Stone at a Time" – Tammy Wynette
"The Car" – Jeff Carson – 1997 BMI Listed Among Top Played Songs of the Year.
"Every Time My Heart Calls Your Name" – John Berry
"The Letter" – Ronna Reeves
"Dixie's Bar & Grill" – Brent Lamb
"A Love Like This" – Cleve Francis
"If Dreams Have Wings" – James T. Horn

Other ventures
A documentarian, Gary's Martin Luther King Jr. documentary They Killed Martin: 3 Lives Forever Changed is available on YouTube. Also a storyteller, he has appeared on Seattle Public radio station KUOW with personal stories about Thornton Wilder and the assassination of Martin Luther King Jr. and A Guide to Visitors—The Best of Stories on Stage.

Gary is also a high school teacher (Haubstadt (IN); Franklin, TN; Middle College, TN; John Overton (TN) and Big Picture (WA), numerologist and a former advertising creative director, radio/television jingle composer, and newspaper editor. He is a member of PEN Canada.

Personal life
Gary is the son of Geoffrey Austin (Dutch) and Helen (née Heyser) Heyde, both deceased. In 1967, he married teacher and actress Glory (Kissel) Heyde. The marriage ended in 2002. He is the father of stage director Rachel Rockwell, who died of ovarian cancer in 2018, and Jeremy Spencer, former drummer for heavy metal band Five Finger Death Punch.

He attended the University of Missouri (Columbia); Lincoln University (Jefferson City) and is a graduate of the University of Evansville (Indiana), with a degree in Speech and Drama.

References

1947 births
Living people
People from St. Joseph, Missouri
University of Missouri alumni
21st-century American novelists
American male novelists
Songwriters from Missouri
Jingle composers
21st-century American male writers
Novelists from Missouri